Keyagana (Ke’yagana) is a Papuan language spoken in Eastern Highlands Province, Papua New Guinea.

References

Kainantu–Goroka languages
Languages of Eastern Highlands Province